Siege of Calais may refer to:

Siege of Calais (1346–1347), the siege and capture of Calais by the English during the Hundred Years' War
Siege of Calais (1349), the failed siege by Sir Geoffroi de Charny on December 31, 1348
Siege of Calais (1436), the failed siege of Calais by Philip the Good, Duke of Burgundy
Siege of Calais (1558), the siege and capture of the town by the French in the reign of Queen Mary of England
Siege of Calais (1596), the capture of the town by the Spanish on behalf of the French Catholic League during the French civil war of 1585-98
Siege of Calais (1940), siege and capture by the Germans during World War II
Operation Undergo, the Allied siege and capture of Calais in 1944
L'assedio di Calais, 1836 opera by Gaetano Donizetti about the 1346 siege